Kandisha is a French horror film directed and written by Alexandre Bustillo and Julien Maury. The film stars Mériem Sarolie, Walid Afkir, Suzy Bemba, Bakary Diombera, Mathilde Lamusse, Félix Glaux-Delporto and Sandor Funtek. Focusing on a teenage girl who must fight to protect her younger brother with help from her two friends from the wraith of a Moroccan figure from folklore she inadvertently summoned

Plot
Three teenage childhood friends invoke the spirit of Aïsha Kandisha, the avenging creature of a Moroccan legend. When one of them Amélie suffers at the hands of a former boyfriend, she asks Kandisha to punish him. The game turns into a nightmare when the people in their closest environment start to re-appear dead as Kandisha not satisfied with one sacrifice starts venting out her rage on any male in her vicinity...including their nearest and dearest. Then, the three friends must do everything possible to contain this evil creature who is demanding to be reborn by using one of them as a human host with Amélie and her two friends turning to an Islamic father and son spiritualists for help, when Kandisha herself starts targeting their male family members with Amélie's precious younger brother Antoine being a special interest to Kandisha.

Cast
 Mériem Sarolie as Kandisha
 Walid Afkir as Recteur
 Suzy Bemba as Bintou
 Bakary Diombera as Ako
 Sandor Funtek as Erwan
 Félix Glaux-Delporto as Antoine
 Dylan Krief as Ben
 Mathilde Lamusse as Amélie
 Nassim Lyes as Abdel
 Samarcande Saadi as Morjana

Release
The film had its world premiere at the 2020 Sitges Film Festival on October 16, 2020 in the Oficial Fantàstic Competición section.

References

External links
 

2020 horror films
2020s French films
2020s French-language films
Films directed by Julien Maury and Alexandre Bustillo
French horror films